The World Boxing Association (WBA), formerly known as the National Boxing Association (NBA), is the oldest and one of four major organizations which sanction professional boxing bouts, alongside the World Boxing Council (WBC), International Boxing Federation (IBF) and World Boxing Organization (WBO). The WBA awards its world championship title at the professional level.  Founded in the United States in 1921 by 13 state representatives as the NBA, in 1962 it changed its name in recognition of boxing's growing popularity worldwide and began to gain other nations as members.

By 1975, a majority of votes were held by Latin American nations and the organization headquarters had moved to Panama. After being located during the 1990s and early 2000s in Venezuela, the organization offices returned to Panama in 2007. It is the oldest of the four major organizations recognized by the International Boxing Hall of Fame (IBHOF), which sanction world championship boxing bouts, alongside the WBC, IBF and WBO.

History
The World Boxing Association can be traced back to the original National Boxing Association, organized in 1921. The first bout it recognized was the Jack Dempsey–Georges Carpentier heavyweight championship bout in New Jersey.

The NBA was formed by representatives from 13 American states, including Sam Milner, to counterbalance the influence that the New York State Athletic Commission (NYSAC) wielded. The NBA and the NYSAC sometimes crowned different "world champions" in the same division, leading to confusion about who was the real champion.

The International Boxing Research Organization describes the early NBA as follows:

Originally more comparable to the present American Association of Boxing Commissions than to its offspring and successor, the NBA sanctioned title bouts, published lists of outstanding challengers, withdrew titular recognition, but did not attempt to appoint its own title bout officials or otherwise impose its will on championship fights. It also did not conduct purse bids or collect "sanctioning fees."

The NBA officially became the WBA on 23 August 1962. Gilberto Mendoza was the President of the WBA from 1982 until his death in 2016, after which Gilberto Mendoza Jr. took over as president. In the 1990s, the WBA moved its central offices from Panama City, Panama, to Caracas, Venezuela. In January 2007, it returned its offices to Panama.

Controversies
As has been the case with all major boxing sanctioning organizations, the WBA has been plagued with charges of corrupt practices.  In a 1981 Sports Illustrated article, a boxing judge claimed he was influenced by WBA President Gilberto Mendoza to judge certain fighters competing for their titles more favorably. The same article also discussed a variety of bribes paid to WBA officials to obtain championship bout opportunities, or higher placement within the organization's rankings. In a 1982 interview, boxing promoter Bob Arum claimed that he had to pay off WBA officials to obtain rankings for his fighters. Further support for allegations of this nature came in the 1980s and 1990s as two other organizations would have similar corruption exposed, including the conviction and imprisonment of IBF President Bob Lee and Graciano Rocchigiani's successful civil prosecution of the WBC that resulted in the organization briefly filing for bankruptcy before reaching a settlement that saved it from collapse.

Fragmented championships
Until the fall of 2021, the WBA recognized up to four world champions in any given weight division, to the point of rendering it technically impossible under certain conditions for a WBA world champion to even hold sole recognition from the organization as its champion in a division.

The most prominent designation is that of the WBA Super champion, which was created in 2000 following a suggestion by Lennox Lewis after he was forced to relinquish his WBA heavyweight title prior to his defense against Michael Grant. This distinction was initially reserved for WBA champions who are simultaneously recognized by the WBC, IBF or WBO. A WBA Super champion is afforded special consideration by the organization with respect to meeting mandatory defense obligations to maintain championship recognition, but it also has opened the door for the organization to recognize a separate world champion, commonly referred to as the Regular champion; creating confusion among fans as to who holds the de facto championship title. Some world champions have been upgraded to WBA Super champion status without winning another organization's title, among them Floyd Mayweather Jr., Chris John, Anselmo Moreno and Manny Pacquiao; or upon defending their WBA title five or more times.  Upon awarding a WBA Super championship, the regular world champion status is deemed vacant, whereupon it is filled by the organization as a separate championship. On March 5, 2021, Claressa Shields became the inaugural WBA Super women's champion at light middleweight.

The WBA further complicated this from time to time by recognizing an interim champion, ostensibly in cases where a designated world champion is, for some reason, prohibited from making a timely defense of their title. Under such conditions, the interim title holder is to be the next person to compete for one of the full championship titles once the champion is in a position to compete. In practice, however, this actually occurred rarely if ever and in 2019 the organization began awarding the WBA Gold title, for which no provision exists even within the organization's own governing documents. As of December 2019 for example, they simultaneously recognized a WBA Super champion (Anthony Joshua), WBA champion (Manuel Charr), WBA interim champion (Trevor Bryan) and WBA Gold champion (Robert Helenius) in the heavyweight division.

There have even been instances where different WBA world champions have defended versions of the same title, in the same weight class, on the same date in different events.

Following the controversial decision in the Gabriel Maestre vs. Mykal Fox fight on August 7, 2021, amid immense public pressure, the WBA finally began eliminating all interim titles in the attempt to return to a single champion per weight division.

Boxer rankings
The organization has further garnered negative attention with respect to its ranking of boxers, in spite of having adopted a complex, documented rating formula in the 2000s. In 2015 for example, Ali Raymi had been rated number six when, in his service as a colonel in the Yemeni armed forces, he was killed. His death didn't significantly hinder his rating position in the WBA however, as in a subsequent ranking he had only dropped to number eleven.

Title reduction plan

In August 2021, a letter sent by the ABC stating that the WBA having multiple titles is "misleading to the public and the boxers". The ABC also stated that if the WBA fails to do a satisfactory action regarding the issue, they would recommend to its members:

This could result in the WBA being blocked in the U.S. and will heavily impact WBA's business.

The WBA in turn responded by declaring all of their Interim titles vacant. They then ordered tournaments to determine a single champion of their weight classes.

At minimumweight, Regular champion Vic Saludar was ordered to face former Interim champion Erick Rosa on August 26, 2021, with Rosa winning the Regular title via split decision on 21 December. it was not until September 29, 2022, until the WBA officially ordered Rosa against Super champion Knockout CP Freshmart, with the fight set to take place in the first quarter of 2023 to determine the sole champion.

At light flyweight, Super champion Hiroto Kyoguchi and Regular champion Esteban Bermudez had already been ordered to fight prior to the ABC letter on June 10, 2021, but complications meant it was not until January 28, 2022, when purse bids were due to be held, however injury to Kyoguchi meant the WBA instead approved the rematch between Bermudez and former regular champion Carlos Cañizales 2 days earlier on January 26. Bermudez vs Cañizales did not end up happening due to the latter's short-lived decision to move up to flyweight, and thus Kyoguchi-Bermudez took place on June 10, with Kyoguchi winning by TKO. Former Interim champion Daniel Matellon was ordered to face Cañizales on September 30 in a final eliminator for the Super title, with the winner becoming mandatory to Kenshiro Teraji, who defeated Kyoguchi by TKO in November, in a fight to determine the sole champion.

At flyweight, the removal of Interim champions meant Artem Dalakian was left as sole champion of the division. Despite never being upgraded to Super champion, Dalakian had been the WBA's primary champion since winning the title in 2018, due to the absence of a Super champion since 2015. Dalakian was ordered to face former Interim champion Luis Concepción on August 19, 2021, whom he defeated by TKO on November 20 to remain sole champion.

At super flyweight, Super champion Juan Francisco Estrada was ordered to face Regular champion Joshua Franco on February 9,  with the fight going to purse bid on April 19. Despite it being announced on May 17 that the fight would take place on July 16, Estrada was disowned and stripped by the Championships Committee on August 11, leaving Franco as the sole champion of the division.

At bantamweight, Regular champion Guillermo Rigondeaux was stripped of his title on August 14, 2021, after facing then WBO champion John Riel Casimero. The WBA announced its refusal to sanction the fight on July 23, in respect of restrictions placed on Regular titles by the WBO, and declared Rigondeaux would have to request to be ranked in order to follow through with the fight, in which his Regular title would be declared vacant. Super champion Naoya Inoue then became sole champion.

At super bantamweight, Brandon Figueroa was stripped of his Regular title on December 2, 2021, after facing Stephen Fulton in a WBC and WBO unification on November 27. This was due to restrictions imposed by the WBO who refuse to sanction fights involving the Regular title, with the WBA respecting this and announcing on August 17 (before the ABC letter) that Figueroa would be stripped. This came after Figueroa was allowed to unify in his previous fight with then WBC champion Luis Nery on May 15, as the WBC do not impose the same restrictions on the Regular title. This left Super champion Murodjohn Akhmadaliev as sole champion. Former Interim champion Ra’eese Aleem did not move forward any with WBA sanctioned fight and was subsequently dropped from the initial mandatory position.

At featherweight, Regular champion Leigh Wood was ordered to face former Interim champion Michael Conlan on August 27, 2021,  with Wood winning by KO on 12 March 2022. On April 6th, the WBA ordered the bout between Wood and Super champion Léo Santa Cruz.  On July 19, the WBA rejected a request from Santa Cruz to unify with WBC champion Rey Vargas, insisting he had to fight Wood, which Santa Cruz accepted 2 days later on July 21. On August 12th, it was announced that Santa Cruz and Wood had reached an agreement, and thus purse bids were cancelled. On August 24, the WBA announced they had approved the previously rejected unification between Santa Cruz and Vargas, as well as a title defence for Wood against Mauricio Lara, with the winners set to fight each other. Wood, who was due to fight Lara on September 24, pulled out with an injury on September 19, and on September 30th the WBA ruled Wood must face Santa Cruz in his comeback fight, and refused to grant any additional exceptions. Purse bids were scheduled for December 12, however did not take place due to Santa Cruz relinquishing his Super title and leaving Wood as the sole champion of the division.

At super featherweight, Gervonta Davis vacated his Super title on August 28, 2021, leaving then Regular champion Roger Gutiérrez as the sole champion. Gutiérrez had been ordered to face former Interim champion Chris Colbert on August 15, but following Gutierrez's withdrawal, replacement Héctor Garcia defeated Colbert via unanimous decision to become mandatory challenger on 26 February 2022. The WBA thus ordered Gutiérrez vs Garcia on June 27, with Garcia winning a unanimous decision victory to become champion on 20 August 2022.

At lightweight, Regular champion Gervonta Davis was due to face former Interim champion Rolando Romero on December 5, 2021, but following withdrawal from Romero instead faced Isaac Cruz, winning by unanimous decision. The WBA then formally ordered Davis Vs Romero on January 24, 2022,  with Davis winning via TKO on May 28 to retain the Regular title.  As of December 2022, a fight between Davis and Super champion Devin Haney has not been ordered.

At super lightweight, Gervonta Davis vacated his Regular title on December 8, 2021, leaving then Super champion Josh Taylor as sole champion. Taylor was then ordered to face former Interim champion Alberto Puello on March 9, 2022, but was stripped on May 14 for failing to sign the contract.  Puello was then ordered to face Batyr Akhmedov on June 12 following a panel to determine the next challenger, with Puello winning via split decision on August 20 to become champion.

At welterweight, the WBA ordered a 4-man box off on September 16, 2021, consisting of Super champion Yordenis Ugas against Eimantas Stanionis and Regular champion Jamal James against Radzhab Butaev, with the winners set to face each other to determine one champion. On October 20, the WBA initially rejected permission from Ugas to unify with WBC and IBF champion Errol Spence Jr., while Butaev defeated James via TKO on October 30 to become Regular champion. On February 8, 2022, it was announced that Ugas and Spence Jr. would indeed unify on April 16, followed by the announcement of Butaev vs Stanionis on the undercard on February 21. On April 16, Stanionis defeated Butaev via split decision to become Regular champion, while Spence Jr. defeated Ugas via TKO to become Super champion.  Following this on November 21, the WBA granted special permission for Spence Jr. to defend his titles against former unified champion Keith Thurman, while Stanionis was instead ordered to face Vergil Ortiz Jr., with the winners set to meet. Former Interim champion Gabriel Maestre was not included in the WBA's box off, and subsequently did not receive any title shot.

At super welterweight, Regular champion Erislandy Lara was forced to vacate on August 31, 2021, leaving Super champion Jermell Charlo as sole champion.

At middleweight, Super champion Gennady Golovkin was ordered to face Regular champion Erislandy Lara on September 23, 2022. On 9th March 2023, it was announced that Golovkin had vacated the Super title, leaving Lara as sole champion. Former Interim champion Chris Eubank Jr. did not move forward with any WBA sanctioned fight and was thus dropped from the initial mandatory position.

At super middleweight, there has been no fights ordered for any WBA World title since the title reduction plan as of December 2022. Canelo Álvarez and David Morrell are the Super and Regular champions, respectively.

At light heavyweight, the removal of Interim champions meant Super champion Dmitry Bivol became sole champion. Former Interim champion Robin Krasniqi lost in a rematch to Dominic Boesel on 10 October 2021, with Boesel becoming #1 challenger for Bivol. Boesel fought #2 ranked Gilberto Ramirez in a final eliminator to determine the mandatory challenger on 14 May 2022, with Ramirez winning by knockout. Bivol Vs Ramirez was then ordered on 11 July, with Bivol winning via unanimous decision on 5 November.

At cruiserweight, Super champion Arsen Goulamirian and Regular champion Ryad Merhy had been ordered to fight on July 19, 2022 (a rematch of their 2018 Interim title fight). Merhy instead pursued a fight with WBC champion Illunga Makabu, however after concerns with making the cruiserweight limit, Makabu vs Merhy was called off on August 8, and Merhy sent a formal letter to the WBA vacating his title 4 days later on August 12, leaving Goulamirian as the sole champion.

At heavyweight, Regular champion Trevor Bryan was ordered to face former Interim champion Daniel Dubois on January 31, 2022, with Dubois winning via KO on June 11. Following this, Dubois was ordered to face Super champion Oleksandr Usyk on December 12.

As of March 2023, 12 divisions; Light flyweight, Flyweight, Super flyweight, Bantamweight, Super bantamweight, Featherweight,  Super featherweight, Super lightweight, Super welterweight, Middleweight, Light heavyweight and Cruiserweight now only consist of a vacant championship or one, sole champion.

Man of Triumph belts
Since 2015, the WBA awards a customized version of their WBA Super champion belt to big fights involving a WBA championship. The WBA called this the Man of Triumph belt, named after the trophy awarded to the winner of the Mayweather vs. Pacquiao fight. The plate of the belt has the images of the two boxers fighting. Floyd Mayweather Jr. received the first gold-plated version of the belt while Manny Pacquiao was awarded a one-time rhodium-plated version. Other recipients of the custom gold-plated belt are Anthony Joshua, Vasyl Lomachenko, Manny Pacquiao, Oleksandr Usyk, Canelo Álvarez and Callum Smith.

Cooperation with IBA
The WBA signed a cooperation agreement with the amateur governing body International Boxing Association in 2022.

Current WBA world title holders
As of

Male

Female

Affiliated organizations
 WBA Asia
 WBA Oceania
 Federación Latinoamericana de Comisiones de Boxeo Profesional (WBA Fedelatin)
 Federación Bolivariana de Boxeo (WBA Fedebol)
 Federación Centroamericana de Boxeo (WBA Fedecentro)
 Federación del Caribe de Boxeo (WBA Fedecaribe)
 North American Boxing Association (NABA)

See also
 List of major boxing sanctioning bodies
 List of WBA world champions
 List of WBA female world champions
List of current world boxing champions

References

External links

 
 All-time WBA World champions – reference book

 
Professional boxing organizations
Sports organizations established in 1921
1921 establishments in Rhode Island
International sports organizations
Boxing